Back to Dance is Lil Suzy's second studio album. It was released on 11 January 1994 by Warlock Records and sees a closer collaboration with hit producer Tony "Dr. Freestyle" Garcia. It contains a new remix of "Take Me in Your Arms" from her previous album, as well as a cover version of "Turn the Beat Around" (a cover of the Vicki Sue Robinson song).

Track listing 

Lil Suzy albums
1994 albums